Tharapuram is a small village in Gulf of Mannar Sri Lanka. It is located within Northern Province. Sri Lankan cabinet Minister Rishad Bathiudeen hails from this Village. Also  Former Member of Parliament Iyoob born in this Village.

See also
List of towns in Northern Province, Sri Lanka

External links

Populated places in Northern Province, Sri Lanka